Donzaleigh Abernathy is an American actress, author and civil rights activist.

Early life 
Abernathy’s mother was pregnant with her when her parents’ home was bombed in the pre-dawn hours of January 10, 1957 after the successful close of the Montgomery Bus Boycott. Abernathy was born trembling in the segregated St. Jude’s Hospital Montgomery, Alabama and lived there through the “Freedom Riders” movement. In 1962, at the request of the Reverend Dr. Martin Luther King Jr., her family moved to Atlanta, Georgia where she grew up. There, her father, Dr. Ralph David Abernathy, Sr. continued his work co-leading the Civil Rights Movement with Dr. King. In 1965, after participating in “The Selma to Montgomery March for the Right To Vote,” the Abernathy children, along with the King children integrated Spring Street Elementary School and began mass integration of public schools in the South. Abernathy briefly attended the Northside High School for the Performing Arts, before attending and graduating from George School, a Quaker Prep School in Bucks County, Pennsylvania.

Her father was Rev. Dr. Ralph Abernathy, a co-founder and co-leader of the American civil rights movement, and her mother was the life long civil rights activist Juanita Jones Abernathy. She, her sister Juandalynn and brother Ralph David III joined their parents on all the major civil rights marches and witnessed first-hand many significant events of the Civil Rights movement. Her family was very close to that of Dr. Martin Luther King Jr, a prominent leader of the Civil Rights movement. The Abernathy and King children went to school together, performed extracurricular activities together, spent Saturday and Sunday dinners together, as well as spent vacations and holidays together. According to Ms. Abernathy herself, children from both families would hold performances for their parents and their childhood acting teacher Mr. Walter Roberts, the father of movie stars Julia Roberts and Eric Roberts, on these occasions with Yolanda King, one of King's daughters, acting as the director and Dr. King filming their performances. Abernathy has stated "that's really when [she] started acting." She is married to actor/producer Dar Dixon.

Career 
After graduating from Emerson College in Boston, Abernathy moved to New York. She landed her first job after auditioning for a role with the Off Off Broadway production and worked for the Production Designer Eugene Lee and Costume Designer Franne Lee of “Saturday Night Live.” She played Lady in Orange in the Alliance Theater’s Southeastern Equity Tour of “For Colored Girls” and Iris in the Alliance Theater’s “Antony and Cleopatra“ with Jane Alexander and Ed Moore. Since then, Ms. Abernathy has played roles in many movies and television movies, such as Mrs. Don King in the Award Winning HBO Drama “Don King, Only in America.” In the historical Civil War drama Gods and Generals, she portrays the slave, Martha. Although the film itself was not critically well-received, Abernathy was praised for her part by film critic Roger Ebert. Another reviewer stated that "Abernathy's image of Martha combines strength with glamour." She starred for four years as a series regular on Lifetime's Any Day Now. Born in the midst of the Civil Rights Movement after her parents’ home was bombed, Ms. Abernathy’s life has been dedicated to civil and human rights.

Filmography

Film

Television

Books 
The 2001 Smithsonian Institution's book of essays, In the spirit of Martin: the living legacy of Dr. Martin Luther King, Jr. Donzaleigh Abernathy was one of the contributing authors. In 2004, she authored the book Partners To History - Martin Luther King, Ralph David Abernathy and the Civil Rights Movement, in honor of her parents. The book was nominated by the American Library Association as one of the “Best Books for Young Adults,” 2003.

Bibliography
Partners to History: Martin Luther King Jr., Ralph David Abernathy, and the Civil Rights Movement (Crown, 2003) 
In the spirit of Martin: the living legacy of Dr. Martin Luther King, Jr. (Tinwood Books, 2002)

References

External links

1957 births
Living people
Actresses from Montgomery, Alabama
Actresses from Atlanta
Emerson College alumni
American film actresses
21st-century American women writers
20th-century American actresses
21st-century American actresses
African-American actresses
American civil rights activists
Women civil rights activists
American television actresses
George School alumni
20th-century African-American women
20th-century African-American people
21st-century African-American women writers
21st-century African-American writers
Abernathy family of Alabama